Such Late, Such Warm Autumn is a 1981 Ukrainian film directed by Ivan Mykolaychuk.

Plot 
The Bukovynian peasant Rusnak leaves the poor Bukovynian lands and goes to Canada with his little daughter Orissa - maybe he is lucky there? And now Rusnak, using the services of "Intourist", goes to his land, where he was once happy.

References

External links
Watch film

Soviet-era Ukrainian films
1981 films
Ukrainian drama films